Benjamin "Ben" Barker (born 23 April 1991) is a British professional racing driver currently competing in the FIA World Endurance Championship with GR Racing. A Porsche stalwart for over a decade, he is an Australian Formula 3 champion, a Porsche Carrera Cup GB runner-up, a four-time Bathurst 12 Hour class winner and a Dubai 24 Hour overall winner. Despite limited success in the FIA World Endurance Championship, Barker is considered one of the strongest GTE Am drivers, having broken the lap record for the category at the 2018 24 Hours of Le Mans.

Racing record

Racing career summary 

† As Barker was a guest driver, he was ineligible to score points.

Complete FIA World Endurance Championship results
(key) (Races in bold indicate pole position) (Races in italics indicate fastest lap)

Complete 24 Hours of Le Mans results

References

External links 
 
 

1991 births
Living people
Sportspeople from Cambridge
British racing drivers
Australian Formula 3 Championship drivers
Porsche Carrera Cup GB drivers
Porsche Supercup drivers
European Le Mans Series drivers
WeatherTech SportsCar Championship drivers
FIA World Endurance Championship drivers
24 Hours of Le Mans drivers
24H Series drivers
International GT Open drivers
Blancpain Endurance Series drivers
Asian Le Mans Series drivers
Formula Ford drivers
Fluid Motorsport Development drivers
Walter Lechner Racing drivers
Porsche Motorsports drivers
Le Mans Cup drivers
Porsche Carrera Cup Germany drivers